Ulysse Ndong (born 24 November 1992) is a French-born Gabonese professional footballer who plays as a midfielder for the Gabon national team.

Club career
Ulysse Obame-Ndong started his career playing as goalkeeper and he joined with his first professional football club at the age of 16 when he joined Amiens SC from a very mythical club of Racing Club de France Colombes 92. Two years later, he went on trials to London for Queens Park Rangers F.C. where he stayed two months before joining AFC Wimbledon where he played with young talents such as Huw Johnson, Jim Fenlon. In October 2012, Ulysse joined Alki Larnaca F.C. as a free agent. In June 2013, he moved to Othellos Athienou. During 2014–15 with Othellos he had a very good performance and he is considered an upcoming talent.

On 16 October 2016, Ndong joined Bulgarian First League side Lokomotiv Gorna Oryahovitsa but he left the club in July 2017.

On 1 September 2017, Ndong signed with Slavia Sofia.

On 1 July 2018, Ndong signed with Qatari club Al-Khor for two years.

On 10 January 2020, he returned to Cyprus and joined Akritas Chlorakas.

On 23 October 2020, Ndong signed with Saudi club Al-Nojoom for one years.

International career
Ndong is born in France to parents of Gabonese descent. He was called up to the Gabon national football team for a set of 2017 Africa Cup of Nations qualification matches and made his debut in a 1–0 loss against Sierra Leone.

Career statistics

Club

References

External links

1992 births
Living people
Footballers from Paris
People with acquired Gabonese citizenship
Gabonese footballers
Gabon international footballers
French footballers
French sportspeople of Gabonese descent
Association football midfielders
Racing Club de France Football players
Amiens SC players
Queens Park Rangers F.C. players
AFC Wimbledon players
Alki Larnaca FC players
Othellos Athienou F.C. players
Ermis Aradippou FC players
FC Lokomotiv Gorna Oryahovitsa players
PFC Slavia Sofia players
FC Vereya players
Al-Khor SC players
Akritas Chlorakas players
Al-Nojoom FC players
Cypriot First Division players
Cypriot Second Division players
First Professional Football League (Bulgaria) players
Qatar Stars League players
Saudi First Division League players
Gabonese expatriate footballers
French expatriate footballers
French expatriate sportspeople in England
French expatriate sportspeople in Cyprus
Gabonese expatriate sportspeople in Bulgaria
Gabonese expatriate sportspeople in Qatar
Gabonese expatriate sportspeople in Saudi Arabia
Expatriate footballers in England
Expatriate footballers in Cyprus
Expatriate footballers in Bulgaria
Expatriate footballers in Qatar
Expatriate footballers in Saudi Arabia